Asososca Lagoon Natural Reserve is a nature reserve in Nicaragua. It is one of the 78 reserves that are under official protection in the country.

References

Volcanic crater lakes
Protected areas of Nicaragua
León Department
Volcanoes of Nicaragua